Niall Morgan (born 17 July 1991) is an Irish Gaelic footballer who plays for the Edendork St Malachy's club and the Tyrone county team.

A knee injury in 2013 ruled him out for the rest of the season. This was considered a severe blow to Tyrone's hopes of winning the All-Ireland Senior Football Championship.

The COVID-19 outbreak in the Tyrone football squad twice delayed the 2021 All-Ireland Senior Football Championship semi-final against Kerry. Morgan later disclosed that he was one of the players who had contracted the virus, though he mistook his symptoms for hayfever.

He has also played association football for Dungannon Swifts, and represented Northern Ireland Under-18 schoolboys.

References

1991 births
Living people
Edendork St Malachy's Gaelic footballers
Gaelic footballers who switched code
Gaelic football goalkeepers
Tyrone inter-county Gaelic footballers
Association footballers from Northern Ireland
Association football goalkeepers
Dungannon Swifts F.C. players